In Angolan mythology, Kianda (or Dandalunda) is a goddess of the sea, of the waters, and a protector of fishermen. She was traditionally worshiped by throwing offerings such as food and clothing into the sea. A similar African goddess is Yemoja from Yoruba mythology. Every year the Kianda Festival is held to worship her in Luanda, Angola, a week before the festival of the patron saint of the Ilha and Ibendoa (Bengo province) in July. The mosasaur Prognathodon kianda, found in Angola, was named after this deity.

References

Culture of Angola

African goddesses
Angolan culture
Sea and river goddesses